Coreinae is a subfamily in the hemipteran family Coreidae. They have been shown to be paraphyletic with respect to Meropachyinae.

Tribes

The following  tribes belong to the Coreinae:
Acanthocephalini Stål, 1870 - Americas
Acanthocerini Bergroth, 1913 - Americas
Acanthocorini Amyot and Serville, 1843  - Africa, Asia, Australia
Agriopocorini Miller, 1954 - Australia
Amorbini Stål, 1873 - Australia, New Guinea
Anhomoeini Hsiao, 1964 - Asian mainland:
 monotypic tribe: Anhomoeus Hsiao, 1963
Anisoscelidini Laporte, 1832 - Americas, Africa, Europe, Asia 
Barreratalpini Brailovsky, 1988 - central America:
 monotypic tribe: Barreratalpa Brailovsky, 1988
Chariesterini Stål, 1868 - mostly Americas
Chelinideini Blatchley, 1926
 monotypic tribe: Chelinidea Uhler, 1863
Cloresmini Stål, 1873 - SE Asia
Colpurini Breddin, 1900 - Africa, Asia
Coreini Leach, 1815 - Africa, Europe, Asia
Cyllarini Stål, 1873 - tropical Africa, Sri Lanka
Daladerini Stål, 1873 - Africa, Asia
Dasynini Bergroth, 1913 - Africa, Asia, Australia
Discogastrini Stål, 1868 - central and S. America
Gonocerini (synonym Gonocérates Mulsant & Rey, 1870) - Africa, Europe, Asia, Australia
Homoeocerini Amyot and Serville, 1843 - Africa, Asia
Hypselonotini Bergroth, 1913 - Americas
Latimbini Stål, 1873 - Africa
Manocoreini Hsiao, 1964 - China
 monotypic tribe: Manocoreus Hsiao, 1964
Mecocnemini Hsiao, 1964 - China
 monotypic tribe: Mecocnemis Hsiao, 1964
Mictini Amyot and Serville, 1843 - Africa, Asia
Nematopodini Amyot and Serville, 1843 - Americas
Petascelini Stål, 1873 - Africa, Asia
Phyllomorphini Mulsant and Rey, 1870 - Africa, mainland Europe, Asia
 Pephricus Amyot & Serville, 1843
 Phyllomorpha Laporte, 1833
 Tongorma Kirkaldy, 1900
Placoscelini Stål, 1868 - central and S. America
Prionotylini Puton, 1872 - Europe
 monotypic tribe: Prionotylus Fieber, 1860
Procamptini Ahmad, 1964 - Philippines
 monotypic tribe: Procamptus Bergroth, 1925
Sinotagini Hsiao, 1963 - China
 monotypic tribe: Sinotagus Kiritshenko, 1916
Spartocerini Amyot and Serville, 1843 - Americas

Fossil genera 

 Ferriantenna Cumming & Le Tirant, 2021 Burmese amber, Myanmar, Cenomanian
 Magnusantenna Du & Chen in Du et al. 2021 Burmese amber, Myanmar, Cenomanian

References

 
Coreidae
Hemiptera subfamilies